The Daana Chintamani Attimabbe Award (or Attimabbe Prashasti) is a literary award dedicated for woman writers in the Indian state of Karnataka. The award was established in 1995 by the government of Karnataka. It is the highest literary honour for woman writers conferred by the Department of Kannada and Culture, Government of Karnataka State, and recognises works written in the Kannada language (one of the 22 official languages of India).

The award is named after Attimabbe, a renowned woman of ancient Karnataka, lived in 950 AD who was parental figure to many Kannada poets including Ranna, Ponna and others. The award has been given to women writers for their lifetime contribution to the Kannada literature and is presented by the Chief Minister.

Since its inception in 1995, the award has been given to a total of 24 individuals. T. Sunandamma was the first writer to receive the award and the most recent recipient is Choodamani Nandagopal, who was awarded for the year 2019 for her lifetime contribution.

Recipients

See also
 Attimabbe

References

External links
 Daana Chintamani Attimabbe award recipients in Kannada-Department of Kannada and Culture

Awards established in 1995
Civil awards and decorations of Karnataka
Indian literary awards